Erwin O'Neil Stadium (Spanish: Estadio de Fútbol Erwin O'Neil) is an association football stadium located on the island of San Andrés, part of the Colombian department of the Archipelago of San Andrés, Providencia and Santa Catalina. The stadium, built in 2008, can seat up to 5,000 people and is home to Real San Andrés who play in the Categoría Primera B, Colombia's second tier professional football league. 2014 edition of the Copa Claro tournament was kicked off in Erwin O'Neill Stadium.

References 

E
2008 establishments in Colombia